Loïc Meillard (born 29 October 1996) is a Swiss World Cup alpine ski racer and specializes in the technical events of slalom and giant slalom.

Born in Neuchâtel, Meillard made his World Cup debut in January 2015; his younger sister Mélanie is also a World Cup alpine racer.

Career
Meillard made his World Cup debut at age 18 in the Adelboden giant slalom in January 2015. At the Junior World Championships that March at Hafjell, Norway, he won a bronze medal in the super-G, silver in the giant slalom, and gold in the combined.

In February 2016, Meillard scored his first World Cup points at the Hinterstoder giant slalom, finishing in 27th place, and his first top ten (eighth) came the following week at Kranjska Gora. His first podium was a runner-up in a giant slalom in December 2018 at Saalbach-Hinterglemm,  On the same hill the next day, Meillard finished second in the slalom, runner-up to Marcel Hirscher.

At his third World Championships in 2021, Meillard won two bronze medals, in parallel giant slalom and combined, and was fifth in the giant slalom.

World Cup results

Season titles
 1 title – (1 PAR)

Season standings

Race podiums
 2 wins – (1 GS, 1 PG)
 14 podiums – (7 GS, 4 SL, 1 SG, 1 AC, 1 PG); 59 top tens

World Championship results

Olympic results

References

External links

 

1996 births
People from Neuchâtel
Swiss male alpine skiers
Living people
Alpine skiers at the 2018 Winter Olympics
Alpine skiers at the 2022 Winter Olympics
Olympic alpine skiers of Switzerland
Sportspeople from the canton of Neuchâtel
21st-century Swiss people